Hooson is a surname. Notable people with the surname include:

Emlyn Hooson, Baron Hooson QC (1925–2012), British politician
Isaac Daniel Hooson (1880–1948), Welsh solicitor and poet
Tom Hooson (1933–1985), British politician

See also
Hobson (surname)